Basudev refers to the 1984 Nepali film directed by Neer Shah. 

Basudev may also refer to:
Krishna, a major Hindu deity also known as Basudev, Basudeb, Vasudev or Vasudeva.
Vasudeva, father of Krishna
Basudev (name)